ORP Grom was the lead ship of her class of destroyers serving in the Polish Navy during World War II. She was named after the Polish word for Thunderbolt, while her sister ship  translates to lightning.

Design
Grom was thought of as a large destroyer, similar to flotilla leaders. As Poland had only one major seaport, the main task of the Polish naval forces was to secure supplies shipment to and from allied countries. Because of that, the Grom class was designed to fulfill both the role of shore defence and convoy escort and was supposed to be stronger than single enemy destroyers.

Also, as it was not clear whether the ships would be used to secure convoys to the Polish port of Gdynia or the Romanian port of Constanţa (through the Romanian Bridgehead), the possible range was much larger than in the case of destroyers designed exclusively for the Baltic Sea.

Construction and career
Grom was ordered from the British J. Samuel White shipyard in Cowes and was laid down in 1935. The destroyer was commissioned in 1937.

The commanders of the ship were:
 Lieutenant Commander Stanisław Hryniewiecki - January 25, 1937 - June 20, 1938
 Commander Aleksander Hulewicz - March 13 or. June 20, 1938 - May 4, 1940

The British ships led the Polish flotilla to Leith, and in the night the Polish destroyers came to Rosyth.

During her operations in the Norwegian Campaign, Grom was ranked by the German soldiers as probably the most hated of all the Allied ships deployed to the area. This hatred was founded on the fact that Grom took an intense interest in all hostile movements on shore and was reputed to spend hours lurking the coast in order to harass German forces. On 4 May 1940, Grom carried out what turned out to be the last of her many naval gunfire support missions in the Narvik area in the Rombaken fjord. She was attacked by a Heinkel He 111 bomber from Kampfgeschwader 100 (piloted by Lt. Korthals). Grom was hit by two bombs and sank after internal explosion.

The wreck was never raised and it was not until 6 October 1986 that it was explored by divers for the first time.

References

Grom-class destroyers
World War II destroyers of Poland
World War II shipwrecks in the Norwegian Sea
1936 ships
Maritime incidents in May 1940
Destroyers sunk by aircraft
Ships built on the Isle of Wight
Ships sunk by German aircraft
1986 archaeological discoveries